The Regional Development Minister (Sar LePituah Azori) is a member of the Israeli government. Created in 1999 during Ehud Barak's government, the ministry was closed by Ariel Sharon in 2003. However, it was recreated in 2009 by Benjamin Netanyahu.

List of ministers

Deputy ministers

References

Government ministries of Israel
Ministry of Regional Cooperation
Lists of government ministers of Israel